DBEdit 2 is a database editor, which can connect to an Oracle, IBM Db2, MySQL and any database that provides a JDBC driver. It runs on Windows, Linux and Solaris.

Open source
DBEdit is free and open source software and distributed under the GNU General Public License. The source code is hosted on SourceForge.

History
DBEdit is developed by Jef Van Den Ouweland. The first Windows and was used to edit an Oracle or IBM Db2 database.
It is written in Java.
Later on, generic JDBC support was added so that the application could connect to basically any type of database that provides a JDBC driver.
One year after the first release, support for other operating systems, such as Linux and Solaris, was added. The last version of DBEdit was released in May 2012

See also

Java Database Connectivity
SQL
Comparison of database tools

External links
Official website
Project site

References

Cross-platform free software
Database administration tools
Microsoft database software
Oracle database tools
MySQL